Nešto između is a 1982 Yugoslavian drama film directed by Srdjan Karanovic. It was screened in the Un Certain Regard section at the 1983 Cannes Film Festival.

Cast
 Caris Corfman - Eve (Eva)
 Miki Manojlović - Janko (as Predrag Manojlović)
 Dragan Nikolić - Marko
 Zorka Manojlović - Majka (as Zorka Doknić-Manojlović)
 Renata Ulmanski - Tetka
 Nina Kirsanova - Baba
 Petar Ilić - Sin (as Petar Ilić-Hajne)
 Gorica Popović - Dunja
 Sonja Savić - Tvigica
 Branko Cvejić - Barmen
 Zaba Madden - Konobarica
 Ljubisa Bacic - Laza
 Timothy John Byford - Peter
 Ljiljana Sljapic - Ženska
 Jelica Sretenović - Jelica

References

External links

1982 films
1982 drama films
Serbian drama films
Films set in Belgrade
Films set in Serbia
Films set in Yugoslavia
Films directed by Srđan Karanović
Yugoslav drama films
Films shot in Belgrade
1980s English-language films
English-language Serbian films
English-language Yugoslav films